Dane John Anderson (born 19 October 1984) is an Australian former cricketer who played for Tasmania and club cricket for Glenorchy Cricket Club. Anderson is a left-handed batsman and a part-time wicket-keeper, who was a member of the Tasmanian Tigers winning team in the Ford Ranger One Day Cup season 2007-08.

External links

1984 births
Living people
Australian cricketers
Tasmania cricketers
Cricketers from Launceston, Tasmania